Foreign relations exist between Armenia and Egypt. Egypt was one of the first countries in the Arab world which recognized the independent Armenia in 1991. In March 1992, the diplomatic relations were established between the two countries. In May 1992, the first diplomatic mission of Armenia in the Arab East was inaugurated in Cairo. Egypt has an embassy in Yerevan.

Bilateral relations

Following Armenia's independence from the Soviet Union, Egypt was one of the first countries to recognize Armenia's independence, a Convention on the establishment of the bilateral diplomatic relations has been signed in 1992. The Egyptian embassy in Yerevan was opened in May 1993 while the Armenian embassy in Cairo was opened in March 1992.

The most significant point in the political relations between the two countries is the Armenian appreciation towards Egypt's neutral position with regard to Nagorno-Karabakh conflict, as well as Egypt's hosting the Armenians fleeing from massacres that took place against them, and their integration into Egyptian society.

In the past 20 years, Armenia and Egypt have succeeded in establishing excellent political, economic, cultural, educational, and scientific cooperation. Egypt was one of the first countries in the Arab world which recognized the independence of Armenia in 1991. Armenia and Egypt signed more than 40 bilateral legal documents, dozens of high-level official delegations paid mutual visits, many significant cultural and public events have occurred, and projects of economic cooperation have been worked out by joint efforts.

Recognition of the Armenian genocide

According to the Armenian American newspaper Asbarez, in late 2013, amid rising Turkish-Egyptian tensions that followed the removal of Egyptian President Mohamed Morsi from office in early July 2013, there were many Egyptian editorials and op-eds condemning the Turkish government's Armenian genocide denial, and the topic was discussed on Al-Soura Al-Kamila, a popular Egyptian television talk show hosted by Lilian Daoud.

Mustapha Bakri, an independent member of the Egyptian parliament, introduced a resolution calling for recognition of the Armenian genocide; if adopted, Egypt would be the first Muslim nation to do so. An Arabic-language documentary film, Who Killed the Armenians?, was produced in Egypt and screened at Heliopolis Library.

In a speech at the 2019 Munich Security Conference, Egyptian President Abdel Fattah el-Sisi implicitly recognized the Armenian Genocide, noting that a hundred years before, Egypt had hosted Armenian refugees "after the genocide." The comments were welcomed by Egypt's Armenian community.

High-level visits

To Armenia

To Egypt

Cultural events 
Egyptian Cultural Days were held in November 4–11 in Armenia within the framework of Armenia-Egypt cultural cooperation, intergovernmental agreement signed between the two states. In the framework of Egyptian cultural days in Yerevan 2 ballet performances of Egypt's Opera and Ballet Theatre performed, many Egyptian films presented. Also an art exhibition presenting works of Egyptian artists has been organized.
Armenian folk songs at El-Gumhuriya Hall, Cairo Opera House, 6 October 2011, Distinguished Artist Of Armenia Arsen Grigoryan, singer Anna Kharatyan and the Mro Ensemble gave a concert at the El-Gumhuriya Hall of Cairo Opera House within the framework of events dedicated to the 20th anniversary of independence of Armenia.
Armenian theme at The International Scientific Conference in Alexandria, 27 September 2011, Armenia had a special status of an honorary guest at The fourth International Symposium of History and Publishing in the Languages and Countries of the Middle East. The Symposium also celebrated the 500th anniversary of Armenian book printing and the choice of the city of Yerevan as the World Book Capital 2012 by UNESCO, by dedicating a special session on publishing in Armenia. Within the framework of the three-day scientific conference an exhibition for ancient Armenian books was held in the Library of Alexandria.
Armenian Cultural days in Egypt, 17–22 September 2010, was jointly organized by the Egyptian Ministry of Culture and the Armenian Embassy in Egypt as part of a larger bilateral initiative to foster cultural exchange between Egypt and Armenia. The series included a photo exhibit of Zaven Sargsyan, the director of Sergey Parajanov’s museum, on Armenian architecture in addition to three performances from The Armenian National Song and Dance Ensemble named after Tatoul Altounian, first in Cairo and thereafter at Damanhour’s newly restored Opera House, and the Sayed Darwish Opera House in Alexandria.
Gayane Ballet at Cairo Opera House, 15 & 18 April 2007 Armenian National Academic Opera and Ballet Theater, Yerevan, presented "Gayane" by Aram Khachaturian, conductor Karen Durgaryan, choreographer Hovhannes Divanyan in Cairo and Alexandria. With one show in Cairo Opera House Main Hall and another in Sayed Darwish Theatre, Alexandria, the Gayane performances celebrated the 15th anniversary of the establishment of diplomatic relations between Armenia and Egypt.

See also
Foreign relations of Armenia
Foreign relations of Egypt
Armenians in Egypt
Kalousdian Armenian School
List of Egyptian Armenians
Arek Monthly
Arev (daily)
Tchahagir weekly
Housaper daily

References

External links
Armenian embassy in Cairo

 
Egypt
Armenia